Emil Rajkovic born September 11, 1978 in Skopje is a  Macedonian former professional basketball player and current basketball coach, who currently serves as the head coach for CSKA Moscow of the VTB United League.

He was the head coach of the Polish League club Śląsk Wrocław until 2016.

Career
Rajković played club basketball at the senior level from 1996 to 2004 with the Macedonian League club Rabotnicki, Vardar and MZT Skopje.

Rajković coached KK Feni Industries, MZT Skopje and Rabotnički.

On July 13, 2021, he signed with Avtodor of the VTB United League.

Head coaching career with National teams
2007–2008: Macedonia U-16 national basketball team
2008–2011: Macedonia U-20 national basketball team
2014–2015: Macedonia national basketball team (assistant)
2020–present: Kazakhstan national team - FIBA Asia

Championships and cups as player

National domestic league championships
1995–1996: Rabotnicki: Macedonian First League (basketball)
1996–1997: Rabotnicki: Macedonian First League (basketball)
1997–1998: Rabotnicki: Macedonian First League (basketball)
1998–1999: Rabotnicki: Macedonian First League (basketball)
2000–2001: Rabotnicki: Macedonian First League (basketball)

National domestic cup championships
1997–1998: Rabotnicki: Macedonian Basketball Cup

Championships and cups as head coach

European club continental and regional championships
2010–2011: KK Feni Industries: BIBL

National domestic league championships
2007–2008: KK Feni Industries: Macedonian League
2009–2010: KK Feni Industries: Macedonian League
2010–2011: KK Feni Industries: Macedonian League
 2017 Polish league bronze medal (BM Slam Stal Ostrow Wielkopolski)
 2018 Polish league silver medal
(BM Slam Stal Ostrow Wielkopolski)
2019 Kazakhstan National League Champion PBC Astana
2020 kazakhstan National League champion PBC Astana
 2021 Kazakhstan National League champion PBC Astana

National domestic cup championships
2007–2008: KK Feni Industries: Macedonian Cup
2009–2010: KK Feni Industries: Macedonian Cup
2016: MZT Skopje: Macedonian Super Cup
2019 National Cup of Kazakhstan - PBC Astana
2020 National Cup of Kazakhstan - PBC Astana
2021 National Cup of Kazakhstan - PBC Astana

Honors
 Best coach of all team sports in Macedonia by the association of sports writers, sports hall of fame representatives & Sitel television 2008
 Best coach in Macedonia by the Basketball Federation of Macedonia - 2008, 2011, 2014
 Eurobasket.com All-Macedonian League Coach of the Year - 2008, 2010, 2011
 Eurobasket.com Balkan League Coach of the year 2011
 Balkan League Champion - 2011
 Macedonian National Cup Winner - 2008, 2010
 Macedonian League Champion - 2008, 2010, 2011
 Macedonian Super Cup - Winner 2017
 Eurobasket.com - All Polish league coach of the year 2017 
http://www.eurobasket.com/Poland/news/492260/Eurobasket.com-All-Polish-League-Awards-2017
 Coach of the year Polish basketball by "Polskikosz.pl" 2018 
http://polskikosz.pl/trener-sezonu-emil-rajkovic-stal-idzie-do-gory/
Eurobasket.com - Kazakhstan National League Champion & "coach of the year" seasons 2018/19,2019/20,2020/21
https://www.asia-basket.com/Kazakhstan/news/628791/Asia-Basket.com-All-Kazakhstan-League-Awards-2020
Eurobasket.com - VTB United League “ VTB League Coach of the year” 2019
https://www.eurobasket.com/VTB-United-League/news/581402/Eurobasket.com-All-VTB-League-Awards-2019  
VTB United League “ VTB-League Coach of the year” 2019
https://www.vtb-league.com/en/news/emil-rajkovic-named-2018-19-coach-of-the-year/

Notes

http://www.eurobasket.com/Poland/news/492260/Eurobasket.com-All-Polish-League-Awards-2017
http://polskikosz.pl/trener-sezonu-emil-rajkovic-stal-idzie-do-gory/
https://www.eurobasket.com/VTB-United-League/news/581402/Eurobasket.com-All-VTB-League-Awards-2019
https://nbf.kz/en/news/2207-emil-raikovich-head-coach-of-the-national-basketball-team-of-kazakhstan
http://www.fiba.basketball/asiachampionscup/2019/news/bc-astana-continues-to-rise-in-the-vtb-united-league

External links

1978 births
Living people
Macedonian basketball coaches
BC Astana coaches
BC Avtodor coaches
PBC CSKA Moscow coaches
Macedonian men's basketball players
Macedonian people of Serbian descent
Serbs of North Macedonia
Sportspeople from Skopje